Sant Rafel de sa Creu is a village on the Spanish island of Ibiza.  It is located off the main road which connects Ibiza Town and San Antonio and a short walk from two of the most famous Ibiza nightclubs, Amnesia and Privilege. The village is also home to a smaller and more intimate club called Underground which is hugely popular with locals and workers on the island. 

San Rafael is a small, quiet village with little more than a church, a few bars and restaurants. The majority of the village's population live in the surrounding countryside.

External links
 San Rafael,Ibiza

Populated places in Ibiza